Events from the year 1712 in Ireland.

Incumbent
Monarch: Anne

Events
 12 November – A riot takes place in Dublin during a performance of Nicholas Rowe's Tamerlane a play which supports the Whig view of William III as a justified conqueror of Britain and Ireland. A prologue written by the Whiggish Samuel Garth is read, which inflames Tory and Jacobite opinion.
 Bridge built over the River Bann at Banbridge.
 A translation of the 1662 Book of Common Prayer into Irish, made by John Richardson (1664–1747), is published.

Births
October 15 – Leslie Corry, politician (d. 1741)
October 22 – James Hamilton, 8th Earl of Abercorn, politician (d. 1789)
Bartholomew Mosse, surgeon, impresario, founder of the Rotunda Hospital in Dublin (d. 1759)
Marcus Paterson, lawyer and politician (d. 1787)
approximate date
Riggs Falkiner, politician (d. 1797)
Arthur Jones-Nevill, politician (d. 1771)

Deaths
January 5 – Richard Jones, 1st Earl of Ranelagh, politician (b. 1641)
October – Robert Blennerhassett, lawyer (b. 1652)
William Edmondson, founder of Quakerism in Ireland (b. 1627)

References

 
Years of the 18th century in Ireland
Ireland
1710s in Ireland